Mykhaylo Leonidovych Mykhaylov (born 6 July 1959 in Kirovohrad) is a Ukrainian professional football coach and a former player.

Honours
 European Cup Winners' Cup: 1985–86.
 Soviet Top League: 1980, 1981, 1985, 1986.
 Soviet Cup: 1982, 1987.
 Soviet Super Cup: 1981, 1986.

References

1959 births
Living people
Sportspeople from Kropyvnytskyi
Soviet footballers
Soviet expatriate footballers
Ukrainian footballers
Ukrainian expatriate footballers
Expatriate footballers in Greece
Soviet expatriate sportspeople in Greece
Ukrainian expatriate sportspeople in Greece
FC Dnipro players
FC Dynamo Kyiv players
FC Shakhtar Donetsk players
Apollon Smyrnis F.C. players
Soviet Top League players
Association football goalkeepers
Neftçi PFK players
Recipients of the Order of Merit (Ukraine), 2nd class
Recipients of the Order of Merit (Ukraine), 3rd class
Association football goalkeeping coaches
FC Dynamo Kyiv non-playing staff